The discography of multinational German dance pop group Bad Boys Blue consists of 15 studio albums, 29 compilation albums, six re-worked compilations and 35 singles. The group's biggest hit to date is "You're a Woman" released in 1985, which peaked at No. 8 in their home market, Germany. The single did well also in Austria, Sweden and Switzerland peaking at No. 1, No. 6 and No. 2 respectively.

Albums

Studio albums

Compilation albums

Re-worked Compilation albums

Singles

Videography

Video albums

References

Discographies of German artists